Savvas Kofidis (born 5 February 1961) is a Greek professional football manager and former player.

Career
Born in modern-day Kazakhstan to Pontic Greek parents, he started his career in Iraklis, debuting on 18 January 1981 when Iraklis was participating in the Beta Ethniki. In Iraklis's team he played seven seasons before heading to Olympiacos. In 1992, he joined Aris Thessaloniki F.C., the city rivals of Iraklis, where he played until rejoining Iraklis in the 1996–97 season.

International career
His three appearances at the 1994 World Cup rounded off his national team career, which lasted from 1982 to 1994, giving him 67 caps and 1 international goal (9 January 1985, against Israel). He retired from professional football in 1999.

Coaching career
During the 2002–2003 period he was the assistant coach of Ivan Jovanovic in Iraklis, as well as the next period, assisting head coach Sergio Markarián. After Markarián resigned, Kofidis took in charge as the head coach. The next year, with Kofidis taking the reins, was hugely successful as "The Old One", against all expectations, finished 4th in the 2005–2006 Alpha Ethniki championship, and qualified for the UEFA Cup. During the summer, however, many key players were sold as the team was in heavy debt, and the following year was anything but successful. After a string of 10 league matches without a win, and an early exit from the UEFA Cup against Polish team Wisła Kraków, Kofidis resigned. In January 2007 he became head coach in Skoda Xanthi following Takis Lemonis's resignation, but soon left the job. On 30 October 2009 Iraklis F.C. club officials have sacked coach Oleg Protasov to replace him with Kofidis.

Career statistics

References

External links

1961 births
Living people
Pontic Greeks
Soviet people of Greek descent
Greek footballers
Greece international footballers
1994 FIFA World Cup players
Association football midfielders
Iraklis Thessaloniki F.C. players
Olympiacos F.C. players
Aris Thessaloniki F.C. players
Super League Greece players
Super League Greece managers
Greek football managers
Iraklis Thessaloniki F.C. managers
Xanthi F.C. managers
Anagennisi Giannitsa F.C. managers
Sportspeople from Almaty
Footballers from Thessaloniki